is a fictional character in the Final Fantasy series of video games. She is a member of the Viera race, a group of rabbit-like humanoid people. She appears in Final Fantasy XII, having left her tribe and worked as a copilot to the pirate Balthier. Her character design was created by Akihiko Yoshida. She is voiced by Nicole Fantl in English and by Rika Fukami in Japanese. Her English voice performance took inspiration from Icelandic singer Björk, which left Square Enix skeptical but eventually sated with their explanations. Fran later appears in the Nintendo DS sequel Final Fantasy XII: Revenant Wings.

Fran has received mostly popular reception since her debut and is noted for having popularized the fictional Viera race. She is often regarded as one of the highlights of Final Fantasy XIIs cast and in the series in general and has been praised for her design by multiple critics. She is considered a rare example of a non-white female character in video games, though this assessment is considered by some to be problematic due to racial implications.

Concept and creation
Fran's visual appearance was designed by Akihiko Yoshida and her story was written by Daisuke Watanabe for Final Fantasy XII, which had a development period of 2001 to 2006. She is a Viera, a humanoid species that resembles rabbits. She is also co-pilot to her friend Balthier and the mechanic to their ship, the Strahl. Like all Viera, she is exceptionally sensitive to the magical mist that permeates Ivalice, the setting of Final Fantasy XII, which can send her into a rage. The decision to feature non-human species in the world of XII was due to wanting to feature different races and social classes and to represent real-world history. Characters' outfits in XII were made to show more skin due to the setting being hot.

Fran was voiced by Nicole Fantl in English and by Rika Fukami in Japanese, while her motion capture work was performed by Hiroko Harada and Kouhei Takeda. Fukami had her speak in a "straightforward, slightly gruff" fashion. Localizer Alexander O. Smith took inspiration in writing Fran's English dialogue from Icelandic singer Björk, casting for people who can actualize that inspiration. Smith said that he ideally wanted Björk to be cast. Square Enix was initially skeptical of the direction they were taking with Fran's voice as it was significantly different from the Japanese version to a larger extent than the other lead characters, but the staff was able to convince them by explaining that they were trying a new take on her Viera race. Smith identified Fran and the other Viera as some of his favorite characters to write in Final Fantasy XII due to their Icelandic accents.

Appearances
Before the events of Final Fantasy XII, Fran lived with her sisters Jote and Mjrn in Eruyt Village, a secluded Viera settlement in Golmore Woods, but became restless and desired to see the outside world. This was a major source of conflict between her and the other Viera, especially her sister Jote, who served as the village matriarch. Fran argued that although all Viera begin their lives in the forest, they are not necessarily bound to remain there to the end. When the party encounters an impassable Viera barrier, Fran is forced to return to her former village and ask for help. She learns from Jote that their sister Mjrn has run off. When Fran finds her and brings her back, Mjrn reveals she wishes to leave Golmore, but Fran advises her against doing so, relating how her own independence has cost her her family and her spirituality with Golmore. After Fran departs, she feels as though Jote cares for her, despite her reluctance to say as much.

She later appears in the Nintendo DS sequel Final Fantasy XII: Revenant Wings alongside Balthier, which is set on a place called the Sky Continent. She and Balthier initially work to destroy the auralith, one of multiple crystals that keep the Sky Continent afloat that protagonists Vaan and Penelo are trying to protect, though it is later explained that they were trying to prevent the souls of a people called the aegyl which reside in the auralith from being taken. In battle, Fran uses status effects against opponents, a unique combat ability among the playable cast. She also appears as a playable character in Itadaki Street Portable. She was included in Dissidia Final Fantasy: Opera Omnia as a playable character, where she has the unique ability Viera Commandments.

Reception
Fran has received mostly positive reception. She is credited with popularizing the Viera race by PC Games N. Chris Carter and Joe Juba, writing for Game Informer and Destructoid respectively, both enjoyed Fran, regarding her and Balthier as standout characters among Final Fantasy XIIs cast. David Lozada and Aoife Wilson, writing for Game Revolution and Vice respectively, regarded her as a standout character in the Final Fantasy series, with the latter regarded a scene of her going into a rage as one of the most memorable in the series. She did not rank among a list of favorite female Final Fantasy characters by Japanese fans, which caused Mollie L. Patterson of Electronic Gaming Monthly disappointment.

Writers for IGN and Complex found her design attractive, with the former drawing a comparison between Fran and the Playboy bunny. Emma Boyes for IGN and Nadia Oxford for USGamer both enjoyed Fran's design in spite of the impracticality of her armor and heels. Jef Rouner for Houston Press found her design attractive as well, identifying her as the hottest furry character. He noted her height, accent, and figure as highlights. Rouner also noted her as a rare example of black women in games, though he noted that she seemed to be more of an example of "exotic flavoring" due to her species. Responding to this assessment, Alisha Karabinus of NYM Gamer expressed discomfort at the idea of identifying a non-human character as black, commenting that "there's a lot to unpack" with this. Philip Boyes of Eurogamer took issue with Fran's portrayal, particularly how her design demonstrates "othering" and a "male fantasy". Greg Vallentin of Video Gamer found her voice acting to be "cringey", while writer Mattie Brice discussed how her accent is meant to differentiate her from the rest of the cast. Brice found her exotic, citing her accent, skin color, and species, though she felt that she had the least personality of the main cast.

References

Black characters in video games
Female characters in video games
Fictional archers
Fictional hunters in video games
Final Fantasy characters
Final Fantasy XII
Square Enix protagonists
Video game characters introduced in 2006
Woman soldier and warrior characters in video games
Kemonomimi

ja:ファイナルファンタジーXII#主要人物